Ivybridge railway station is situated on the Exeter to Plymouth line and serves the town of Ivybridge in Devon, England. It is  measured from the zero point at  via Box.

History

First station

It was not complete when the South Devon Railway was opened, but was brought into use just six weeks later on 15 June 1848. The building was situated on the north side of the track, immediately to the west of Ivybridge Viaduct. Passenger trains were withdrawn on 2 March 1959 but goods traffic continued until 29 November 1965.

Current station

A new station costing £380,000 was opened east of the viaduct on 15 July 1994 by British Rail under the Regional Railways sector.  To fit in the narrow site, the platforms are staggered, with the eastbound platform nearer to Plymouth than the westbound.  It was marketed as a Park and Ride station with a large 100-space car park to entice car drivers off the A38 road into Plymouth, but the level of train service has never offered the convenient and frequent service that is normally associated with such facilities.

Services

Former services 
An early timetable shows just 2 of the 10 trains to Plymouth railway station arriving there before 09:00, and the last return train leaving at 21:11.  The afternoon service was gradually reduced until by September 1999 only 7 trains ran to Plymouth and 9 return.  From 20 May 2001 a through service from London Waterloo station was introduced by South West Trains, which resulted in 11 trains each way.  When First Great Western proposed their new Winter 2006 service there were many complaints as it would have seen a drastic reduction in trains calling at Ivybridge.  After considering the position, a total of 9 trains were scheduled by the two companies but with just one train arriving in Plymouth before 09:00.

Current services 
As of December 2021, there are fifteen services eastbound, two of which terminate at London Paddington, and eighteen services westbound, most of which terminate at Plymouth. Travel times to Plymouth are typically 15 minutes, while it takes around 50 minutes to reach Exeter.

References

External links

Ivybridge Rail Users Group

Railway stations in Devon
Railway stations in Great Britain opened in 1848
Former Great Western Railway stations
Railway stations in Great Britain closed in 1965
Reopened railway stations in Great Britain
Railway stations in Great Britain opened in 1994
Railway stations opened by British Rail
Railway stations served by Great Western Railway
Ivybridge
DfT Category F2 stations